Marc-Vivien Foé (1 May 1975 – 26 June 2003) was a Cameroonian professional footballer, who played as a defensive midfielder for both club and country.

Having initially played for Canon Yaoundé, Foé went on to play professionally in Ligue 1 and the Premier League with Lens, West Ham United, Lyon and Manchester City. On 26 June 2003, Foé died suddenly during an international match for Cameroon, an event which shocked the football community worldwide. The death was later ruled to be due to hypertrophic cardiomyopathy. He was capped 62 times by his nation and had scored 8 goals.

He was posthumously decorated with the Commander of the National Order of Valour and had his shirt number 23 retired by Manchester City.

Club career
Foé was born on 1 May 1975 in Yaoundé. He started as a junior with Elite Two side Union de Garoua. Moving to Canon Yaoundé, one of the biggest clubs in Cameroon, he won the Cameroonian Cup in 1993.

After turning down Auxerre for a trainee position, he signed for another French club, RC Lens of Ligue 1. His debut on 13 August 1994 was a 2–1 win against Montpellier. In five seasons at Lens, he won the 1998 French league title.

In 1998, he was targeted by Manchester United, but Lens turned down a £3 million offer for him. Further negotiations between the clubs were curtailed abruptly after he broke a leg at Cameroon's pre-World Cup training camp, and subsequently missed the whole of the 1998 World Cup.

Shortly after his recovery, he moved to English Premier League club West Ham United, for a club record fee of £4.2 million in January 1999. He played 38 league matches for West Ham, scoring one goal against Sheffield Wednesday. He also scored a goal in West Ham's 3–1 win against NK Osijek in the UEFA Cup.

In May 2000, he moved back to France, joining Lyon on a £6 million transfer. He missed much of the season after he developed symptoms of malaria. After recovery, he won the Coupe de la Ligue in 2001, and the Division 1 league title a year later.

Foé then returned to the English Premier League, loaned to Manchester City in the 2002–03 season for £550,000. His debut on the opening day of the season was a 3–0 loss to Leeds United. Foé was a first team regular for Kevin Keegan's team, starting 38 of 41 matches. His first goal for the club came against Sunderland at the Stadium of Light on 9 December 2002, and he scored five more goals in the next month. His second goal in a 3–0 victory against Sunderland on 21 April 2003 was the club's final goal at their old Maine Road stadium.

International career
Foé began representing Cameroon at under-20s when he was called up to the squad of 18 players for the 1993 FIFA World Youth Championship in Australia, under the management of Jean Manga-Onguéné. He played in all of their three group stage matches, scoring one goal in a 3–2 defeat to Colombia in their second match on 8 March 1993, as Cameroon were eventually eliminated from the competition after finishing third. Foé later made his senior debut against Mexico on 22 September 1993 at the Memorial Coliseum, a match which Cameroon lost 1–0.

The following year, he was included in the Cameroon squad for the 1994 World Cup, starting all three of their matches. Team members had been in various financial and disciplinary disputes with the Cameroon Football Association, and the squad was a shadow of the one which had famously reached the quarter-finals of the World Cup in 1990. Cameroon mustered just one point from three matches, and finished with an embarrassing 6–1 defeat to Russia. However, Foé's consistently strong performances as a defensive midfielder (including a goal assist) prompted interest from European clubs.

He was in the Cameroon squad in the 2002 World Cup. As in 1994, he played in all of Cameroon's matches. Though the team performed better than in 1994, they were again eliminated at the group stage, having beaten Saudi Arabia, drawn with Ireland and lost to Germany.

Death

Foé was part of the Cameroon squad for the 2003 FIFA Confederations Cup. He played in wins against Brazil and Turkey, and was rested for the match against the United States, with Cameroon having already qualified.

On 26 June 2003, Cameroon faced Colombia in the semi-final, held at the Stade de Gerland in Lyon, France. In the 72nd minute of the match Foé collapsed in the centre circle with no other players near him. After attempts to resuscitate him on the pitch, he was stretchered off the field, where he received mouth-to-mouth resuscitation and oxygen. Medics spent 45 minutes attempting to restart his heart, and although he was still alive upon arrival at the stadium's medical centre, he died shortly afterwards. A first autopsy did not determine an exact cause of death, but a second autopsy concluded that Foé's death was heart-related as it discovered evidence of hypertrophic cardiomyopathy, a hereditary condition known to increase the risk of sudden death during physical exercise.

Foé's widow Marie-Louise stated that he had been ill with gastric problems and dysentery before his final match, but he was adamant to play in his adopted hometown of Lyon. Cameroon manager Winfried Schäfer wanted to substitute him minutes before his collapse, observing that the player seemed fatigued, but he signalled that he wanted to continue.

Personal life
Foé was a practising Roman Catholic and donated money to charity regularly.

Tributes
Foé's death caused a profound shock. Numerous tributes to his joyous personality and infectious humour were expressed in the media. Also Thierry Henry and other players pointed to the sky in tribute to Foé after Henry had opened the scoring against Turkey in France's Confederations Cup semi-final that evening.

It was suggested that the Confederations Cup and the Stade Gerland could have been renamed after him, and Manchester City manager Kevin Keegan announced that the club would no longer use the number 23 shirt Foé wore during his successful season there. At Manchester City's former ground, Maine Road, there is a small memorial to him in the stadium's memorial garden, and on the walls of the players' tunnel are plaques paid for by supporters, with their names, dubbed the Walk of Pride. The first plaque on the wall is for Marc and reads "Marc Vivien Foé – 1975–2003". His first club, Lens, gave his name to an avenue near the Stade Félix Bollaert. Foé was given a state funeral in Cameroon. Lens decided to withdraw the number 17 shirt that Foé wore for five years.

Lyon also decided to withdraw the number 17 shirt that Foé wore a year before when he played at the Stade de Gerland with the Lyon team. People in Lyon were shocked as he had received a warm welcome on his return to the stadium. However, when fellow Cameroonian Jean II Makoun was transferred to Lyon, Makoun took up the number 17 shirt, explaining that he wore the number: "In memory of Marc, for me and for the whole Cameroon, this will be for something."

Prior to the kick-off of the 2009 FIFA Confederations Cup final between the United States and Brazil, his son, then fourteen years old, gave a brief speech in memory of his father.

Career statistics

Club

International

International goals
Cameroon score listed first, score column indicates score after each Foé goal.

Honours

Club
Canon Yaoundé
 Cameroonian Cup: 1993

Lens
 Division 1: 1997–98

West Ham United
 UEFA Intertoto Cup: 1999

Lyon
 Division 1: 2001–02
 Coupe de la Ligue: 2000–01

International
Cameroon
 Africa Cup of Nations: 2000, 2002

Individual
 FIFA Confederations Cup Bronze Ball: 2003

See also
 List of association footballers who died while playing

References

External links

 
 
 Marc-Vivien Foé international statistics at 11v11.com

1975 births
2003 deaths
Footballers from Yaoundé
Cameroonian footballers
Cameroon under-20 international footballers
Cameroon international footballers
Cameroonian expatriate footballers
Cameroonian Roman Catholics
Cameroonian expatriate sportspeople in England
Ligue 1 players
RC Lens players
Premier League players
West Ham United F.C. players
Olympique Lyonnais players
Manchester City F.C. players
Expatriate footballers in France
Expatriate footballers in England
1994 FIFA World Cup players
1996 African Cup of Nations players
1998 African Cup of Nations players
2000 African Cup of Nations players
2002 African Cup of Nations players
2001 FIFA Confederations Cup players
2002 FIFA World Cup players
2003 FIFA Confederations Cup players
Sport deaths in France
Canon Yaoundé players
Association football players who died while playing
Recipients of the Order of Valour
Filmed deaths in sports
Association football midfielders
Deaths from cardiomyopathy